Disability & Society is a peer-reviewed academic journal in the field of disability studies. It was established in 1986 as Disability, Handicap & Society, obtaining its current name in 1994. It is published by Taylor & Francis and the editor-in-chief is Michele Moore (University of Essex). According to the Journal Citation Reports, the journal has a 2017 impact factor of 1.212, ranking it 42nd out of 98 journals in the category "Social Sciences, Interdisciplinary" and 40th out of 69 in the category "Rehabilitation".

References

External links

Disability studies
Multidisciplinary social science journals
Publications established in 1986
Taylor & Francis academic journals
English-language journals
10 times per year journals